Zodia scintillana is a moth of the family Choreutidae. It is known from Central and South America, including Costa Rica. The habitat consists of tropical rain forests.

The length of the forewings is about 4-4.7 mm. It is a diurnal species. Adults are small and dark-colored with specks of iridescent scales on the forewing and golden-green coloration on the thorax. The antennae are white.

The larvae feed on the leaves of Castilla elastica. They prefer to feed on the underside of younger leaves, but never on the youngest ones. Usually there is more than one larva per leaf, ranging up to five or six. They skeletonize the leaves. Feeding takes place from beneath a thin web, which often includes black frass pellets. Full-grown larvae are about 9.5 mm long. Pupation takes place in a cocoon which is usually spun on the underside of a leaf. It is made of thin spindle-shaped webbing and includes sharp hairs from the host plant leaf underside.

References

Choreutidae